Maria Clementina of Austria (24 April 1777 – 15 November 1801) was an Austrian archduchess and the tenth child and third daughter of Leopold II, Holy Roman Emperor and Maria Luisa of Spain. In 1797 she married her first cousin Prince Francis, Duke of Calabria, heir to the kingdoms of Naples and Sicily. She was modest, well educated and kind, becoming popular in her adoptive country. Afflicted with frail health, she died of tuberculosis, age twenty four. Her only surviving child was Princess Caroline, Duchess of Berry.

Early life

Archduchess Maria Clementina was born at the Villa del Poggio Imperiale, then located in the Grand Duchy of Tuscany, which had been ruled by her father Leopold I, Grand Duke of Tuscany (later Holy Roman Emperor) since 1765. She was named after Prince Clemens Wenceslaus of Saxony, her mother's uncle and brother of Maria Amalia of Saxony, Maria Clementina's maternal grandmother.

Her father was a son of Empress Maria Theresa and her mother a daughter of Charles III of Spain and Maria Amalia of Saxony. Maria Clementina was her parents' tenth child among sixteen children. She was raised in the Grand Duchy of Tuscany where her father ruled and the family lived until 1790 when, at the death of Maria Clementina's paternal uncle, Joseph II, her father became Emperor of the Holy Roman Empire and the family moved to the court of Vienna.

In the same year, 1790, she was engaged to Francis, Hereditary Prince of Naples, eldest surviving son of Ferdinand IV of Naples and his consort, Maria Carolina of Austria. Prince Francis was the Heir apparent to both the Neapolitan and Sicilian thrones. They were double first cousins as they shared all their grandparents in common. Their union was the last of three between the Austrian and Neapolitan royal families, the previous two being between Archduke Francis, her oldest brother and Maria Theresa of Naples and Sicily in 1790 after Archduke Ferdinand and Luisa of Naples and Sicily.

The marriage by proxy took place on 19 September 1790. It was a turbulent period with the Napoleonic wars afflicting the Italian peninsula and the actual wedding did not occur for several years. In the meantime, both of Maria Clementina's parents died in 1792, in a short period of time, and her brother Francis became the new Emperor. A truce with France finally allowed Maria Clementina to travel to Naples in 1797. A frigate picked her up in Trieste, and her new family awaited her at Foggia where the wedding took place on 26 June 1797. It was a simple event since it was war time.

Hereditary Princess

Maria Clementina was considered to be rather pretty, though unfortunately marked by smallpox, but was regal in her bearing. "My son loves her passionately and she reciprocates," wrote the Queen of Naples, her mother-in-law, adding that: "It is a pleasure to see them harmonize so well... I am delighted with the Princess, gentle, fresh sensible and accommodating." However, Maria Clementina was homesick and her character was sullen and reserved. Some weeks later Queen Maria Carolina added about the couple: "Her husband is her husband two or three times in twenty four hours, a matter which interests her. In spite of this, there is a sadness, a boredom, an invincible disgust. I think it must be due to her health or it is unnatural, she has no taste for anything at all. It is not that she regrets her life in Vienna.... I will do everything for her happiness, although I am sowing amid brambles and on thorny soil. But she is my son's wife. Thanks to my training the young man is very much in love with her as a woman... but this may not last with so much disgust, boredom and no charm of feature, which he is fortunately too nice to notice... I shall try to win her confidence, but I am not sure of succeeding. All her wants are anticipated; nothing is lacking; she is discontented and everybody notices it."

Maria Clementina was dignified and kind. Better educated and more intelligent than her placid husband, she dominated him. The couple got along well. "Her husband adores her in every sense of the word. He says she loves him, and assuredly shows and demands many proofs of love" wrote the Queen of Naples. The couple's marital passion astonished the Queen who: "asked heaven to calm their over-excited senses by sending them children". Like her husband, Maria Clementina cared little for court life. She preferred family games, moonlit walks on the terrace, and conversation.

They had two children. She died in Naples the year after she gave birth to a son. She is thought to have died from lung disease or tuberculosis, leaving behind her daughter and her devastated husband.  She was buried in Basilica of Santa Chiara, Naples, with her son.

After her death, her husband married Infanta Maria Isabel of Spain, again his first cousin, the youngest surviving daughter of Charles IV of Spain (brother of Maria Clementina's mother) and Maria Luisa of Parma.

Her only daughter, Maria Carolina, married Charles Ferdinand, Duke of Berry in April 1816. He was the son of Charles X of France and Princess Maria Teresa of Savoy. The couple were the parents of the French pretender Henri d'Artois, comte de Chambord and the Duchess of Parma making Maria Clementina an ancestress of the present Duke of Calabria and his rival the Duke of Castro.

Issue
Princess Caroline of Naples and Sicily (5 November 1798 – 17 April 1870) married Prince Charles Ferdinand, Duke of Berry and had issue.
Prince Ferdinando, Duke of Noto  (27 August 1800 – 1 July 1801) died in infancy.

Ancestry

Notes

References
Acton, Harold. The Bourbons of Naples (1734-1825). Prion books limited, London, 1989 (first published in 1957).

External links

1777 births
1801 deaths
19th-century deaths from tuberculosis
Nobility from Florence
Austrian princesses
House of Habsburg-Lorraine
House of Bourbon-Two Sicilies
Neapolitan princesses
Sicilian princesses
Burials at the Basilica of Santa Chiara
Italian Roman Catholics
Hereditary Princesses of Naples
Daughters of emperors
Children of Leopold II, Holy Roman Emperor
Daughters of kings